Truxene is a polycyclic aromatic hydrocarbon. The molecule can be thought of as being made up of three fluorene units arranged symmetrically and sharing a common central benzene. Truxene is solid, and it is slightly soluble in water.

History
Truxene has been known since the end of the 19th century. J. Hausmann came across it in 1889 while investigating the reactions of 3-phenylpropionic acid with phosphorus pentoxide. He could not determine the exact structure but assumed it was a cyclic trimer of 1-indanone. According to him, it was formed by the condensation of 1-indanone resulting from intramolecular acylation of 3-phenylpropanoic acid.

Frederic Stanley Kipping was able to confirm the structure of truxene in 1894 and obtained the compound by the trimerization of 1-indanone.

Preparation
Truxene is prepared by the cyclotrimerization of 1-indanone in a mixture of acetic acid and concentrated hydrochloric acid.

Uses
Truxene has a star shape, and it is therefore suitable as a starting point for the synthesis of dendrimers.

Derivatives of truxene have also been used for the synthesis of liquid crystals and fragments of fullerene.

References

polycyclic aromatic hydrocarbons